Anthology is a 2-LP and double-play cassette tape greatest hits compilation by the Canadian-American rock group the Band, released in 1978. In 1980, the set was re-released as two separate albums and cassette tapes, Anthology Volume 1 and Anthology Volume 2. In 1988, it was reissued on CD, again in 2 separate volumes.

Track listing

Volume 1

Volume 2

References

1978 greatest hits albums
Capitol Records compilation albums
The Band compilation albums